Minjungseorim Bobmunsa, Ltd. is a Korean publishing house company headquartered in Paju Book City, Korea. The company specializes in Korean and foreign dictionaries that it distributes internationally.

Beopmoon Minjoong publishes Korean dictionaries, English dictionaries, short stories, language books, religious books and other foreign dictionaries.

See also
Korean studies

External links
Beopmoon Minjoong Publishing House Homepage (in Korean)

Book publishing companies of South Korea
Publishing companies established in 1952
Mass media in Paju
1952 establishments in South Korea